The Selkirk First Nation (Hucha Hudan people) is a First Nation self-government in the Canadian territory, Yukon. Its original population centre was the trading post of Fort Selkirk, Yukon along the Yukon River, but most of its citizens now live in Pelly Crossing, Yukon where the Klondike Highway crosses the Pelly River. The language originally spoken by the Selkirk people was Northern Tutchone.  There is a great effort to preserve the language and culture, as can be seen by the popularity of the Selkirk "Keeper of the Songs", Jerry Alfred.

The Selkirk First Nation signed a Yukon Land Claims agreement in 1997.

References

External links
Selkirk First Nation website
Selkirk First Nation page on the Council of Yukon First Nations web site
Government of Canada's Department of Indian and Northern Affairs First Nation profile

Northern Tutchone
First Nations in Yukon
First Nations governments in Yukon